The Sisters /  (Moriori: Rakitchu)<ref name="polp">Government of New Zealand, Dept. of Conservation (1999) Chatham IslandsConservation Management Strategy.

The islands are:

 Big Sister (Rangitatahi proper)
 Middle Sister (Te Awanui)
 Little Sister

Fauna

The islands have the second largest breeding colony of the northern royal albatross, and provide breeding sites for Buller's albatross, northern giant petrel, fairy prion, broad-billed prion, sooty shearwater, common diving petrel, grey-backed storm petrel, white-faced storm petrel, pitt shag, subantarctic skua, red-billed gull, and white-fronted tern. The site has been identified as an Important Bird Area by BirdLife International because it supports Buller's albatrosses and northern giant petrels.

A species of stag beetle called Geodorcus sororum'' is endemic to the islands.

See also

 List of islands of New Zealand
 List of islands
 Desert island

References

Islands of the Chatham Islands
Uninhabited islands of New Zealand
Important Bird Areas of the Chatham Islands
Seabird colonies